Riel is a 1979 Canadian made-for-television biographical film about Métis leader Louis Riel.

Plot
 Louis Riel (Cloutier) leads the Red River and North-West Rebellions against the Canadian government's expansionist ideas.
 The first was a successful rebellion in which created the Province of Manitoba and a later more violent and unsuccessful one in Saskatchewan in 1885 which led to his capture, trial and eventual execution

Cast
 Raymond Cloutier as Louis Riel
 Christopher Plummer as Prime Minister John A. Macdonald
 Roger Blay as Gabriel Dumont
 Maury Chaykin as Howard
 Barry Morse as MacTavish
 Leslie Nielsen as Major Crozier
 Dave Thomas as Militia Captain
 William Shatner as The Barker
 Don Harron as Donald Smith
 Chris Wiggins as General Middleton
 John Neville as General Wolseley
 Lloyd Bochner as Dr. Schultz
 James Bradford as Captain Bra
 Brenda Donohue as Mrs. Schultz
 Marcel Sabourin as Joseph-Noël Ritchot
 Gary Reineke as Thomas Scott
 Fern Henry as Maguerite Riel
 Tony Robinow as Lemieux

Filming
 Shot at Cinespace Film Studios in Kleinburg, Ontario, with additional photography at Ottawa, Ontario.
 The production utilized the local community to fulfill extra roles and stunt riders. Community members like Jim Naish, and others, earned a spot with his shooting and riding abilities.

References

External links
 
 

Canadian biographical drama films
CBC Television original films
Canadian war drama films
English-language Canadian films
1970s biographical drama films
Films shot in Toronto
Films set in the 1880s
British Empire war films
1979 television films
1979 films
Métis film
Red River Rebellion
North-West Rebellion
Biographical films about rebels
1979 Western (genre) films
Cultural depictions of Louis Riel
Films directed by George Bloomfield
Canadian drama television films
1970s Canadian films
1970s English-language films